Miss Grand Spain 2022 (Spanish: Miss Grand España 2022) is the sixth edition of Miss Grand Spain beauty contest, held at South Park Auditorium of Maspalomas in Las Palmas Province on 2 May 2022. The Miss Grand Spain 2021 Alba Dunkenberck of Costa Canaria crowned her successor, a Cuban-Spanish Hirisley Jiménez of Las Palmas, at the end of the event. Jiménez then represented Spain at the Miss Grand International 2022 pageant held on October 25 in Indonesia, and was named the fifth runner-up.

Thirty-four delegates who qualified via the provincial contests competed for the national title. The event was hosted by "Roberto Herrera" and was beamed live to a virtual audience worldwide via the pageant YouTube channel, named GrandSpainTV. The event was also attended by Nguyễn Thúc Thùy Tiên  and "Teresa Chaivisut", the vice president of Miss Grand International.

In addition to crowning the country representative, Miss Grand Spain 2023 was announced to be happening in Puerto de la Cruz in the Province of Santa Cruz de Tenerife, three consecutive years for the Canary Islands to host the pageant.

Background

History
On 1 January 2022, the pageant organizer published the announcement of the 2022 competition host province on their social media, the contest is scheduled to happen on 2 May at South Park Auditorium of Maspalomas in the province of Las Palmas.

Selection of contestants
Thirty-four national delegates were selected to participate by their regional licensees, 23 of which obtained the title after winning the respective local pageants, while 10 runners-up of those local pageants were additionally appointed to represent the neighboring provinces due to a lacking of provincial directors. The remainder 1 candidate, Mar Pallini, who previously obtained second place at Miss Grand Barcelona 2020, was elected to represent the province of Lleida without participating in any 2022 regional contests.

In the province of Barcelona, local pageants are also held in Anoia, Baix Llobregat, and Osona, to determine delegates for the province competition.

Main Pageant

Preliminary activities
 Pre-pageant voting:
  
 
 
 Swimsuit contest: held on 28 April at Holiday World entertainment center in Maspalomas where all 34 aspirants paraded in a swimwear one by one in front of the panel of judges, the representative of Euskadi, "Oihana Torres", was named the winner at the grand final round on 2 May and automatically placed in the top 10 finalists of the final competition, regardless of all accumulation scores.
 Preliminary competition:  held on 1 May at the South Park Auditorium of Maspalomas, where all 34 contestants competed in swimwear and evening gowns in front of a panel of preliminary judges. The scores from the preliminary event, together with a closed-door interview portion, the swimsuit competition as well as the scoring via all ancillary activities, determines the top 15 finalists who were later announced on the grand final stage on 2 May.

Grand Final
The grand final round of Miss Grand Spain 2022 was held on the night of 2 May at South Park Auditorium of Maspalomas city in Las Palmas, hosted by "Roberto Herrera" and was beamed live to a virtual audience worldwide via the pageant YouTube channel, named GrandSpainTV. As the tradition of the pageant, 15 semifinalists are chosen from the initial pool of contestants through observation during the entire pageant, a closed-door interview, swimsuit round as well as a preliminary competition, which featured contestants competing in swimsuits and evening gowns. The top 15 finalists were then competed in the swimsuit round, with 10 of them advancing to the Top 10, this number eventually was reduced to 9 with the 10th semifinalist being the "Best in Swimsuit" winner determined through the swimsuit contest previously held on 28 April, all 10 semifinalists would then compete in an evening gown and the top 5 finalists were decided.

The top five then competed in the question-and-answer portion, where each entrant was asked a different question. The judges select the winner based on their answer, then the host sequentially announced the fourth, third, and second runners-up. The last 2 candidates from Las Palmas and Euskadi then stand in the center of the stage and the Las Palmas representative was named "Miss Grand Spain 2022".

The panel of judges includes:
 Drag Valcano – Drag Queen 2022 of the Las Palmas de Gran Canaria  Carnival
 Janet González Carballo – Medical director and orthodontist
 Blas García – Official surgeon of Miss Grand Spain
 Nguyễn Thúc Thùy Tiên – 
 Teresa Chaivisut – Vice-president of Miss Grand International Ltd.
 Vicente Jiménez – President of Miss Grand Spain

Results summary

Candidates
34 delegates were selected by regional licensees to compete for the national title of Miss Grand Spain 2022.

References

External links

 Miss Grand Spain official website

Grand Spain
Miss Grand Spain
Beauty pageants in Spain